Thomas Paul Patrick Knox (November 23, 1933 – August 24, 2022) was a Canadian professional ice hockey right winger who played in one National Hockey League game for the Toronto Maple Leafs during the 1954–55 season.

Knox was also a member of the Kitchener-Waterloo Dutchmen who won the bronze medal for Canada in ice hockey at the 1956 Winter Olympics. He died on August 24, 2022, at the age of 88.

Career statistics

Regular season and playoffs

International

See also
 List of players who played only one game in the NHL

References

External links
 
 Paul Knox's profile at SportsReference.com
 

1933 births
2022 deaths
Canadian ice hockey right wingers
Ice hockey people from Toronto
Ice hockey players at the 1956 Winter Olympics
Medalists at the 1956 Winter Olympics
Olympic bronze medalists for Canada
Olympic ice hockey players of Canada
Olympic medalists in ice hockey
Ontario Hockey Association Senior A League (1890–1979) players
Toronto Maple Leafs players
Toronto St. Michael's Majors players
Toronto Varsity Blues ice hockey players